I packed my bag is a memory game often played as a car game. In the traditional version of the game, one person says "I packed my bag and in it I put...", and names any object. The next person then says "I packed my bag and in it I put...", followed by the original suggestion, and adding their own. The game continues with more objects being added, and a player is disqualified if they forget one of the previously occurring items or can not think of a new item to add to the bag. The game continues until all but the winner has been disqualified.

Example 
A typical list after five turns might be something like: "I packed my bag and in it I put a book, a toothbrush, a towel, my pet mouse Herman and a bar of chocolate."

Variants

Alphabetical 
A common variation of the game is that the items listed must be in alphabetical order, so the first person would need to choose an object beginning with A, the second person's object would begin with B, and so on. Alternatively, objects can be named in any alphabetical order, but without repeating an earlier starting letter.

Scenario 
Other variations involve using a scenario other than packing the bag. For example, "'I went to the zoo and saw..." following the same rules as either of the above variants. The game can also be played as "I went on a picnic" or "I went to the shops".

See also
 Here Comes an Old Soldier from Botany Bay, a nursery rhyme sung in a similar way

References

Car games
Word games
Memory games